Leonard (or Lenny) Sax (or Saxe, Sachs) may refer to:

 Leonard Saxe (born 1947), American social psychologist, especially concerning the American Jewish community
 Leonard Sax, American psychologist and physician, author of books for parents
 Leonard Sachs (1909–1990), British actor
 Lenny Sachs (1897–1942), American football and basketball player and coach